Jack Scott may refer to:

Sports
Jack Scott (American football) (1928–2014), college football and basketball coach in the United States
Jack Scott (Australian rules footballer) (1915–1997), Australian football player
Jack Scott (baseball) (1892–1959), American baseball player
John Scott (cricket and rugby league) (1888–1964), Australian cricketer and rugby league player, often called Jack Scott
Jack Scott (footballer, born 1875) (1875–1931), English footballer with Blackpool
Jack Scott (footballer, born 1905) (1905–1976), English footballer with Doncaster Rovers, Norwich City and Southampton
Jack Scott (speedway rider), Australian speedway rider
Jack Scott (Australian actor)

Politicians
Jack Scott (California politician) (born 1933), California State Senator
Jack Scott (New Zealand politician) (1916–2001), New Zealand politician of the National Party

Others
Jack Scott (activist) (1910–2000), Irish born union activist in Canada; World War II croix de guerre recipient
Jack Scott (meteorologist) (1923–2008), former BBC Weather presenter and meteorologist
Jack Scott (singer) (1936–2019), Canadian singer and songwriter
Jack Scott (sportswriter) (1942-2000), American sportswriter and activist
Jack Hardiman Scott (1920–1999), British journalist and broadcaster
Alan John Lance Scott (1883–1922), known as Jack, New Zealand-born First World War squadron commander and flying ace
Jack Scott, the name of the disc jockey in the stage version of High School Musical

See also 
Jackie Scott (1933–1978), English footballer
John Scott (disambiguation)